St Jude Melkite Catholic Church is a Melkite Greek Catholic Church which follows the Byzantine Rite.  It is one of 45 Melkite Greek Catholic churches or missions reporting to the Melkite Greek Catholic Eparchy of Newton. The Church is located at 126 SE Fifteenth Road, in Brickell in Miami, Florida 33129.

Architecture
The church was built in 1946 in Romanesque Gothic style and designed by the architectural firm of Henry Dagit & Sons of Philadelphia and constructed by the firm of McCloskey & Co., also of Philadelphia. It is built of reinforced concrete and faced with Indiana Bedford limestone with an exposed concrete ceiling and stenciled color decorations on the exposed beams and arches. The floors are of terrazzo and the main altar and two side altars have marble facing. The cornerstone was laid on May 3, 1946, and the church was completed by September 1946.
The interior design of the church was modified to conform to the Byzantine Rite. An iconostasis was added as well as Byzantine Icons.

References

External links
 

Churches in Miami
Eastern Catholic churches in Florida
Melkite Greek Catholic churches in the United States
1946 establishments in Florida
Churches completed in 1946